Accident Prone may refer to:
Accident Prone (album), a 2005 album by Ira Losco
 "Accident Prone" (song), a 1978 single released by the British rock band Status Quo
 "Accident Prone", a 1995 song by Jawbreaker from Dear You
Accident-proneness